Princess Suchun (died 1345) was the only daughter of King Chungseon of Goryeo. Since her mother was unknown, it was speculated that she was a maid/low-born woman.

When the King stayed in Yeongyeong, Yuan dynasty, he summoned Heo-Jong (허종) and gave him a generous gift by saying,

They later married but childless and in early 1345, she died and as her husband, Heo was said to be very sad about this and died while mourned her affairs.

In popular culture
Portrayed by Lee Il-hwa in the 2005 MBC Mini series Jikji.

References

Year of birth unknown
Date of birth unknown
Place of birth unknown
1345 deaths
Goryeo princesses
13th-century Korean women